Trillium flexipes, known as the nodding wakerobin, bent trillium, or drooping trillium, is a species of flowering plant in the family Melanthiaceae. It is found from Minnesota to Ohio, south to Tennessee, with isolated (and sometimes rare) populations in New York, Pennsylvania, Alabama, and other states. It is an endangered species in Ontario and possibly extirpated in North Carolina.

Description

T. flexipes is a perennial herbaceous plant that spreads by means of underground rhizomes. In northern areas, the flower tends to hang below the leaves, while central and southern strains have a large erect flower. The flower petals are normally white but can be reddish or maroon. The fruit is rosy red to purplish and fragrant of ripe fruit.

T. flexipes is known to hybridize with other Trillium species. In particular, hybrids between T. flexipes and T. erectum can occur. Indeed, the red-petaled forms of T. flexipes tend to occur in regions where the ranges of both species coincide. Hybridization is also suspected between T. flexipes and T. sulcatum.

Bibliography

References

External links 

 Biodiversity Information Serving Our Nation (BISON) occurrence data and maps for Trillium flexipes

flexipes
Plants described in 1840
Flora of Eastern Canada
Flora of the Northeastern United States
Flora of the Southeastern United States
Flora of the North-Central United States
Taxa named by Constantine Samuel Rafinesque